There were a number of engine sheds and railway works located in York. The large York North engine shed became the National Railway Museum in 1975.

Overview

Engine sheds
The following engine sheds were located in York:

 York North steam shed 1878 – 1967
 York South steam shed 1847 – 1967
 York Diesel Depot 1967 – 1982
 York Layerthorpe 1913 – 1981
 Siemens Train Maintenance Centre 2007 – present day
 Rowntrees (Industrial site with engine shed) 1909 – 1987

Railway works
To get a complete picture of activity in the York area the three railway works located in the city are also included in this survey as at one time they have been responsible for the maintenance of locomotives.

 Queen Street locomotive works
 York Wagon works
 Holgate Road carriage works

Railway companies
Prior to 1923 several railway companies ran trains to York. By 1853 the North Eastern Railway (NER) was the dominant operator and by the 1870s the other significant operators were:

 Midland Railway
 Great Northern Railway
 Lancashire and Yorkshire Railway
 Great Eastern Railway
 London and North Western Railway
 Great Central Railway

After 1923 the North Eastern Railway and Great Northern Railway were taken over by the London and North Eastern Railway which remained the dominant operator in the area. The other three companies became part of the London Midland & Scottish Railway. Prior to 1922 the Great Eastern Railway had come to an arrangement with the NER who had worked their trains through from Lincoln.

York North

York North was opened by the North Eastern Railway in 1878 the year after the current York station was opened. With the relocation of the station outside of the city walls, it made operational sense to have an engine shed at the north end of the station as many trains changed locomotives at York. It also had good access to the freight yards and the carriage sheds located at Clifton.

On opening, the shed consisted of three roundhouses each with a 45-foot turntable linked to a coaling stage.

In 1891 the original 45-foot turntable in no 2 roundhouse was replaced by a 50-foot turntable. A new water tank was provided in 1909. In 1911 a fourth roundhouse was built and the two existing 45-foot turntables were replaced with electrically operated turntables. All these improvements were complete by 1915.

In 1923 operation of the shed became the responsibility of the London and North Eastern Railway.

In 1932 further modernisation took place with the fitting of a 70-foot Mundt type turntable built by Ipswich firm Ransomes & Rapier and the installation of a mechanical coaling plant. Prior to this the coaling would have been done by hand.

The North shed eventually contained four roundhouses. Locomotives were stabled around these under cover and would move off the shed onto their next duty. Normal procedure was that arriving locomotives would have their ash cleared out from the firebox before being coaled and watered in anticipation of the next duty. If a locomotive required repair, the coaling and watering was sometimes done after the repair had been effected.

As the organisational structure of the railways changed in 1923 with The Grouping and with nationalisation in 1948 so the importance of York North shed rose and York South shed fell.

In April 1942 the shed was hit by a bomb during an air raid during the Baedeker Blitz and a number of locomotives were destroyed.

The British Railways depot code allotted in 1949 was 50A. These codes are allocated to locomotives to show the depot responsible for the maintenance of the locomotive.

Rebuilding of the shed followed in 1954 with roundhouses 1 and 2 being demolished and replaced by a straight shed. Roundhouses 3 and 4 were re-roofed and the 70-foot turntable in roundhouse 4 was renewed.

The roundhouses were closed to steam traction in 1967 and the straight shed became York diesel depot (see below). In March 1970 an attempt was made to demolish the mechanical coaling plant, but the explosives used left the structure leaning over. Attempts were made to pull it over with hawsers attached to locomotives, but they proved fruitless and it was only in May that a crane equipped with a wrecking ball finished the job.

Following renovation of the roundhouses, the premises were occupied by the National Railway Museum which opened in 1975. When the diesel depot closed in 1983 this was also taken over by the museum and part of this area is still used to overhaul preserved locomotives and rolling stock.

1923 allocation

The allocation of locomotives to York North covered many classes of locomotive, ranging from small shunting engines to main line locomotives capable of hauling major express services. The table below shows the allocation on 1 January 1923 (the first day of the London and North Eastern Railway taking over from the North Eastern). The LNER locomotive classification has been used with the North Eastern Railway locomotive classification in brackets. No Great Northern class numbers have been included.

The following Great Northern Railway locomotives were allocated to the area. Before 1923 these would have been looked after at York South but after that date they were looked after at York North. Including these, York North had an allocation of 143 engines.

1943 allocation

The Second World War saw the highest number of locomotives allocated to York North. This was the allocation in March 1943:

Of special note is the 2 Southern Railway D class locomotives – it was not unusual for foreign locomotives to be transferred around the country. There is some doubt about what these locomotives are. Hoole states they are D class 4-4-0s from the London Brighton and South Coast Railway whilst Appleby states they are D class 4-4-4 locomotives. The only southern railway D class engine was a former South Eastern and Chatham 4-4-0 (one of which sits in the National Railway Museum in 2012. A number of Southern Railway King Arthur class locomotives were based in the Newcastle area during the war and were also frequent visitors to both York sheds.

GNR – Great Northern Railway
LNER – London North Eastern Railway
NER – North Eastern Railway
SECR – South Eastern and Chatham Railway (became Southern Railway in 1923)

1964 allocation

By 1964 there were a number of diesel locomotives as well as steam locomotives. Four years later the steam locomotives had been withdrawn.

Note that almost all the small tank engines such as the J77 class have been replaced by diesel shunters of class 03,04 and class 08. 42 years after the first survey, York still had an allocation of NER locomotives – 2 x J27 and 5 x B16. As well as the main line diesels there were some powerful steam freight locomotives allocated to York such as the WD and 9F class. Total allocation at this time was 166 locomotives.

LMS – London Midland and Scottish
WD – War Department
DE = Diesel Electric
DM – Diesel Mechanical

York South

The original engine sheds at York were built on the York South site and designed to service the original station which was a dead end terminus within the city walls (although there was a temporary station outside the city walls prior to this). As the railways developed it became apparent that this terminus was inadequate in terms of size and operational practicability; southbound trains had to reverse in from the main line necessitating additional journey time. In the 1870s the decision was taken to move to a new site outside the city walls and the new station (still in use in 2019) was opened.

The oldest shed on site was a three-road straight shed, probably built for the Great North of England Railway in 1840/1 which remained in use until it was demolished in 1963. This was an originally but with a single track serving a 12-foot diameter turntable. Dimensions 153 feet x 54 feet.

The York and North Midland Railway built a shed in this area, but this was demolished when the new station was built in 1877. Another four engine sheds were built in this area. The first two were roundhouses completed in 1849/50 and 1851/2 each with 16 stalls and 42-foot turntables. These were designed by the YNMR engineer in chief Thomas Cabry. One of the roundhouses was out of use by 1923 and used for wagon sheet repairs. Later a NER petrol engined saloon was kept there. The earlier roundhouse building was destroyed by fire in October 1921. The second roundhouse remained in use until 1961 although largely for stabling purposes. The two roundhouses were conjoined.

A third larger roundhouse was built in 1863 with a 45-foot turntable and space for 18 locomotives. this was an 18 sided octadecagon and was 172 feet in diameter. It was designed by NER architect Thomas Prosser (who also built York station). This was closed in May 1961 and demolished in November 1963.

Little is known about the other straight shed, although it was in use as a signal fitting shop before being demolished in 1937 when new platforms were built at York station (the current platforms 11 and 12).

Once York North shed was opened in 1878, York South went into decline with the NER largely decamping to the North shed. That said, NER locomotives did continue to be stabled at York South. Visiting locomotives were for a period hosted at York South before using the Queen Street site from 1909 (after the south end of York station was re-modelled) and then returning to York South in 1925.

After demolition of the buildings took place in 1963, the site was largely unused. A turning triangle has occupied the site (used for the turning of steam locomotives) and a couple of short sidings used to stable diesel locomotives are adjacent to the station.

In the mid 2000s, the site was considered as a possible location for York City Football Club.

In 2012 the turntable pits and ground level remains of the sheds were excavated prior to the building of a new Network Rail signalling centre.
At the end of October 2012, the remains were being covered over in anticipation of work starting on the new signalling centre.

York Diesel Depot

After the last roundhouses (Numbers 3 and 4) were closed in 1967 and steam locomotives ceased to be allocated to York, the remaining allocation of diesel locomotives were maintained in the straight shed which had been built to replace roundhouses no 1 and 2 in 1954.

The following classes of diesel locomotive were allocated to York during this time.

British Rail Class 03
British Rail Class 04
British Rail Class 05
British Rail Class 20
British Rail Class 24
British Rail Class 25
British Rail Class 31
British Rail Class 37
British Rail Class 40
British Rail Class 47
British Rail Class 55

The depot was home to the Class 55 Deltic locomotives from May 1979 up until their withdrawal in 1982. At this time they had been displaced from the express workings on the East Coast Main Line and were operating secondary stopping services on that route as well as cross-Pennine services to Liverpool Lime Street.

The depot was closed in January 1982, but stabling was undertaken in the sidings to the north of the site for at least another 18 months. This is the site of the 2005 depot built for Trans-Pennine Express DMUs. The table below shows the final allocation of locomotives (all British Railways designs).

York Layerthorpe

There was a small locomotive shed on the independent Derwent Valley Light Railway at York (Layerthorpe) railway station. This was a single tracked shed at the end of the platform at Layerthorpe. The first shed on the site was of wooden construction but this was replaced at some point with a corrugated iron shed.

The railway had a number of railcars in the 1920s but freight was worked by NER/LNER or BR locomotives. The table below lists the stock owned by the company in the 1920s.

Between 1929 and 1969 the line was worked by main line locomotives.

In 1969 the DVLR decided to buy two ex-British Rail Class 04 shunters to operate services rather than hiring in British Rail Class 03 locomotives. The table below lists the locomotives owned by the DVLR

Joem was purchased to run  short lived steam train passenger operation.

The line closed on 27 September 1981.

There are no remains of the shed (or the station) on the site, although the track bed is now a cycle path.

Siemens train maintenance depot

The Leeman Road railway depot in York was built for Siemens between 2005 and 2007 for maintenance of the new Class 185 diesel multiple units acquired at the same time for use on the new Transpennine franchise operated by First TransPennine Express.

Locomotive and rolling stock works

York Queen Street Works

In 1839 a small repair shop was opened on Queen Street by the York and North Midland Railway.  This expanded, and by 1849 it was repairing significant numbers of locomotives. In the early days of the railway engines, locomotives required more repairs as this was an emerging technology. Also, as the technology developed, many older locomotives were updated at this location. The work on engines was carried on in York until about 1905. The works also carried out construction and repair of carriages and wagons and by 1864 was producing 100 wagons per week.

Most locomotives constructed on the site were put together by contractors rather than built by the York and North Midland Railway. The York and North Midland Railway was merged with several other railway companies to form the North Eastern Railway in 1853.

In 1865 the North Eastern Railway decided that the facilities for wagon production were outdated and a new facility was built adjacent to the freight avoiding line (see below).

The North Eastern Railway decided in the late 1870s to concentrate carriage building on a new site in York at Holgate Road (see below).

A plan of the site dated 1901, shows the various workshops on the site which included:

 Two erecting shops
 Patternmakers shop
 Paint shop
 Cylinder shop
 Fitting shop
 Machine shop
 Cylinder shop
 Coppersmiths shop
 Boiler shop
 Blacksmiths shop
 Foundry
 Brass finishers

There were also a number of stores, offices and boiler houses on the site.

Work on locomotive repairs continued until 1905. In conjunction with the re-modelling at the south end of York station in 1908/1909, the old boiler shop was converted into an engine shed and this site was then used by locomotives from visiting railways such as the Midland, Great Central and the Lancashire & Yorkshire Railway. A new 60-foot turntable was fitted at this time. With the grouping in 1923, Great Northern and Great Central locomotives were dealt with at York North (as they were both constituent parts of the London and North Eastern Railway).

During this period each company had a number of staff allocated to the depot. For instance the Great Eastern Railway had a complement of seven staff in 1917 led by a boiler washer.

In 1925 after the centenary of the Stockton and Darlington Railway the London & North Eastern Railway established a railway museum on the site using the former erecting shops. Remaining visiting LMS locomotives were thereafter dealt with at York South.

The railway museum closed in 1973 in preparation for the opening of the National Railway Museum in 1975.

The turntable still survived in 1976, but disappeared when the area was converted into car parking space.

Many of the buildings are still in existence on the site including the main erecting shops which are in use as a gym.

York Wagon Works

York Wagon Works was a built by the North Eastern Railway in 1867, replacing a wagon shop on the Queen Street site. Wagon manufacturing ceased on the site in the 1960s.

As of 2011 the works is used as a maintenance facility by Freightliner (UK).

York Carriage Works

The Holgate Road carriage works was constructed from 1880 as a planned expansion and replacement of the North Eastern Railway's Queen Street site; the factory began production in 1884 and was substantially expanded in 1897–1900, and saw further modernisations through the 21st century.

The works passed through the owner ship of the NER, London & North Eastern Railway, 1923), BR (British Railways, 1948), British Rail Engineering Limited, 1970), and then privatised and acquired by ABB in 1989.

The works closed in 1996, due to lack of orders caused by uncertainty in the post-privatisation of British Rail period. Thrall Car Manufacturing Company used the works to manufacture freight wagons for English Welsh & Scottish Railway from 1998 to 2002, after which the factory closed again. The works was later used by Network Rail as a base for its rail head treatment trains.

Shunt Turns

A shunt turn is the term for a duty covered by a shunting locomotive. Some shunt turns would have included trips between yards (known as transfer freights). Turns would have varied through the years with some being 24-hour and others only for certain hours of the day. This section is being researched, but this is an indicative list of the locations around the York area where shunting locomotives would have worked. In 2012 York has no allocation of mainline shunting locomotives – any shunting is generally done by the train locomotive. The National Railway Museum does possess a Class 08 shunting locomotive and has used Class 02 and Class 03 locomotives for this duty in the past.

 York Station Pilots
 York Old Station Carriage Sidings
 York North Depot Pilot
 York South Depot Pilot
 Clifton Carriage Sheds
 York freight yards
 Dringhouses Up and Down Sidings
 Layerthorpe Goods Yards
 Rowntrees Trip
 Skelton Yard
 Carriage Works
 Wagon Works
 Branches yard
 Holgate Down Sidings

Routes worked by York-based drivers (NER/LNER)

In steam days York men worked no further north than Newcastle and typically south to Peterborough or Grantham on the ECML. The acceleration of services in the diesel era saw workings to London King's Cross begin as this could be achieved in a typical 8-hour shift.

On passenger workings York drivers covered many of the local lines including those to Bridlington, Hull (via Beverley), Scarborough and Whitby. They usually worked as far west as Leeds.

Goods workings took drivers a bit further and included Grimsby, Frodingham (Scunthorpe), Leicester, Colwick (near Nottingham), Manchester and Burton-on-Trent.

Rowntrees

One of York's other famous industries is the production of chocolate and the Rowntrees factory in York had a connection off the Foss Islands Branch Line. The factory also had a platform which was served by a train service up until closure on 8 July 1988. The site had an extensive rail network and had a number of steam and then diesel locomotives were employed. The factory, which still produces chocolate today as part of the Nestle group, opened in 1909 having relocated from a site in the city centre. At one point the factory had seven miles of track as well as a short 18-inch narrow gauge line.

The 1955 plan of the site shows the engine shed near the Haxby Road roundabout (East) side of the works, and according to the plan was a single track affair. A new shed was built at the northern end of the site in 1964. This had two tracks, was of brick construction and had remotely operated doors and ventilator shutters.

The following locomotives are known to have worked on the site (although this list might be incomplete).

Study of aerial photographs and observation from public roads suggest that neither engine shed have survived.

Notes

Railway depots in Yorkshire
North Eastern Railway (UK)
London and North Eastern Railway
Railway roundhouses in the United Kingdom
Railway workshops in Great Britain
Engine sheds
Engine sheds